The year 1977 was the 196th year of the Rattanakosin Kingdom of Thailand. It was the 32nd year in the reign of King Bhumibol Adulyadej (Rama IX), and is reckoned as year 2520 in the Buddhist Era.

Incumbents
King: Bhumibol Adulyadej 
Crown Prince: Vajiralongkorn
Prime Minister:
 until 20 October: Thanin Kraivichien
 20 October - 10 November: National Revolutionize Council (junta)
starting 11 November: Kriangsak Chamanan
Supreme Patriarch: Ariyavangsagatayana VII

 
Years of the 20th century in Thailand
Thailand
Thailand
1970s in Thailand